Seemore may refer to:

 SEEMORE, a Croatian pay-per-view satellite platform
 SeeMore's Playhouse, an American children's series.

See also
 "See No More"
 See-More
 Seymore (disambiguation)
 Seymour (disambiguation)